Andy Solomons (born 18 September 1987) is a Sri Lankan former first-class cricketer who plays for Colombo Cricket Club. In April 2018, he was named in Galle's squad for the 2018 Super Provincial One Day Tournament.

References

External links
 

1987 births
Living people
Sri Lankan cricketers
Batticaloa District cricketers
Colombo Cricket Club cricketers
Cricketers from Colombo
Southern Express cricketers
Hambantota Troopers cricketers